Megha is a 1996 Hindi film directed by Mohanji Prasad, starring Shammi Kapoor, Karishma Kapoor and Rahul Roy in the lead roles. Supporting casts include Mohnish Bahl, Pankaj Dheer, Saeed Jaffrey, Ronit Roy, Rakesh Bedi, Aparajita, Satyendra Kapoor, Dinesh Hingoo, Rajendranath, Paintal, Tiku Talsania. The film was a box office failure.

Plot
Pretty collegian Megha has three admirers. The first one is Akash, who is in love with her and will do anything for her; Vinod, who is also in love with her, and wants to possess and marry her at any cost; and finally Prakash who admires her secretly, and will do anything to please and protect her. While Prakash lives alone, Akash is the son of a wealthy industrialist, Bhanupratap, who will not let his son marry someone from a middle-class family; while Vinod is wealthy beyond imagination, and quite capable of using this wealth to obtain anything or anyone he chooses. Megha has to decide who she wants to spend her life with.

Cast
 Shammi Kapoor as Bhanupratap
 Karishma Kapoor as Megha
 Rahul Roy as Akash
 Mohnish Behl as Vinod
 Ronit Roy as Prakash
 Pankaj Dheer as Shankar
 Saeed Jaffrey as Jaikishan
 Rakesh Bedi as College Student
 Paintal as Suraj Bhopali 
 Aparajita as Mrs. Bhanupratap
 Satyendra Kapoor as College Principal 
 Rajendranath as Professor
 Dinesh Hingoo as Professor Hingorani 
 Tiku Talsania as Professor Kalidas

Production 
The film was shot on a 35 mm movie film. This film has Karishma Kapoor starring along with her grand uncle, Shammi Kapoor. Rahul Roy and Karishma Kapoor previously costarred in Sapne Sajan Ke (1992).

Music
The music was composed by Raamlaxman.

References

External links 
 

1996 films
1990s Hindi-language films
Films scored by Raamlaxman